Valley Mall is a regional enclosed shopping mall located in Union Gap, Washington, serving the Yakima area. It is the region's sole indoor mall and has 55 stores, anchored by Kohl's and Macy's (formerly The Bon Marché). The mall is located on Interstate 82 and is adjacent to outdoor shopping centers called Valley Mall Plaza, Washington Plaza, and Frontage. Collectively, the property has 80 retailers.

The Valley Mall opened in 1972, under the ownership of engineering firm Morrison-Knudsen. It was purchased in 1980 by First Union Real Estate Investments for $8.9 million and later sold to Center Oak Properties in 1999. The Yakima Mall closed in 2003. Sears closed in December 2022.

References

Shopping malls in Washington (state)
Buildings and structures in Yakima County, Washington
Tourist attractions in Yakima County, Washington
Shopping malls established in 1972
1972 establishments in Washington (state)